Euphaedra apparata is a butterfly in the family Nymphalidae. It is found in the Democratic Republic of the Congo (Sankuru and Kasai).

References

Butterflies described in 1982
apparata
Endemic fauna of the Democratic Republic of the Congo
Butterflies of Africa